Coleophora pilion is a moth of the family Coleophoridae. It is found in southern Russia.

The larvae feed on the leaves of Artemisia turanica.

References

pilion
Moths of Europe
Moths described in 1992